Maidford is a civil and ecclesiastical parish in West Northamptonshire and the diocese of Peterborough situated about  north-west of Towcester. The population at the 2011 census was 168. It was a centre of local Northamptonshire lace-making until the early 20th century.

History
The villages name means 'Maidens' ford'.

Maidford is mentioned in the Domesday Book as the settlement Merdeford Manor.

Buildings
The 13th-century parish church is dedicated to St Peter and St Paul, and forms the centre of a monastic complex used as an hospitalium by the nearby Abbey at Canons Ashby. Since 2006 the parish has been part of the Lambfold Benefice along with the parishes of Blakesley, Adstone, Farthingstone and Litchborough.

References

External links

 Maidford Village website

Villages in Northamptonshire
West Northamptonshire District
Civil parishes in Northamptonshire